Vidura is a character the Hindu epic Mahabharata. Vidura may also refer to
Vidura (name)
Vidura College, Nawala, a private English medium school in Colombo, Sri Lanka
Kaka Vidura, a Hindi poem by Jagadguru Rambhadracharya 
Dacalana vidura, a species of blue butterfly found in South East Asia